Cabo da Praia is a civil parish on the east coast of the municipality of Praia da Vitória on the island of Terceira in the Portuguese Azores. It contains the localities Cabo da Praia, Caminho do Meio and Santa Catarina.

References

Freguesias of Praia da Vitória